Rio is a 2011 American computer-animated musical adventure comedy film produced by Blue Sky Studios and 20th Century Fox Animation, and directed by Carlos Saldanha. The title refers to the Brazilian city of Rio de Janeiro, where the film is set. The film features the voices of Jesse Eisenberg, Anne Hathaway, Leslie Mann, Rodrigo Santoro, Jemaine Clement, George Lopez, Tracy Morgan, will.i.am, and Jamie Foxx. It tells the story of Blu (Eisenberg), a domesticated male Spix's macaw who is taken to Rio de Janeiro to mate with a free-spirited female Spix's macaw, Jewel (Hathaway). The two eventually fall in love, and together they have to escape from being smuggled by Nigel (Clement), a cockatoo.

Saldanha developed his first story concept of Rio in 2005, in which a penguin is washed up in Rio. Saldanha learned of the production of the films Happy Feet (2006) and Surf's Up (2007), and changed the concept to involve macaws and their environments in Rio. He proposed his idea to Chris Wedge in 2006, and the project was set up at Blue Sky. The main voice actors were approached in 2009. During production, the crew visited Rio de Janeiro and also consulted with an expert on macaws at the Bronx Zoo to study their movements.

Rio premiered on March 22, 2011, in Lagoa, Rio de Janeiro, followed by its general release on April 15, 2011, by 20th Century Fox. The film received generally positive reviews from film critics, who praised the visuals, voice acting and music. The film was also a box office success, grossing over $143 million in the United States and $484 million worldwide. The film was nominated for Best Original Song for the song "Real in Rio" at the 84th Academy Awards, but lost to the other nominee, "Man or Muppet" from The Muppets. A sequel, Rio 2, was released on April 11, 2014.

Plot

Exotic birds are smuggled out of Brazil. In Moose Lake, Minnesota, a crate containing a male Spix's macaw hatchling falls from a truck and is found by a child named Linda Gunderson, who names him Blu. Fifteen years later, Blu is frequently ridiculed for being unable to fly by the Canada geese that come by Linda's bookstore. Ornithologist Túlio Monteiro invites Blu and Linda to Rio de Janeiro for Blu, the last known male of his species, to mate with the last known female. At Túlio's aviary in Rio, Blu meets his prospective mate, the fiercely independent Jewel who longs to flee back to the wilderness. The macaws are captured by orphan boy Fernando and sulphur-crested cockatoo Nigel, who both work for a smuggler gang led by Marcel, who wants to leave the country quickly to sell  Blu and Jewel on the black market.

While Fernando has second thoughts, Nigel wants revenge on "pretty birds" after a parakeet replaced him on a television show. Blu's familiarity with cages lets him escape to the jungle with Jewel. Fernando helps Linda and Túlio search for the birds, while Blu and Jewel meet the toco toucan Rafael, whose bulldog friend, Luiz, will remove the legcuffs holding them together. Rafael tries to teach Blu to fly. They meet red-crested cardinal Pedro and his yellow canary friend Nico. Nigel coerces a horde of marmosets led by Mauro to capture Blu and Jewel. Pedro and Nico take the macaws to a samba dance party, where they begin to fall in love, until the marmosets arrive. The five birds escape on a tram.

At the smugglers' hideout Fernando, Linda, and Túlio discover the birds are no longer there. Henchmen Armando and Tipa reveal they plan to use the Rio Carnival parade to take the birds to the airport. Blu and the others meet Luiz, who breaks the chain holding Blu and Jewel together. Once released, Jewel flies happily into the sky with the others. Hurt, Blu goes to look for Linda, but Jewel does not want to leave Blu behind. After a brief argument, they go their separate ways.

When Nigel captures Jewel, Blu and Rafael rush to the carnival to rescue her. As Linda and Túlio pose as dancers in Spix's macaw costumes, Nigel captures Blu and the group. The smugglers take off in their aircraft. Blu breaks out of his cage and releases the other birds. Nigel injures Jewel's wing. Blu sends Nigel into the plane's propellers and the plane begins to fall. The smugglers jump from the plane while Jewel falls out of the open cargo hatch. Jumping out of the plane to rescue her, Blu discovers he can fly. He and Jewel kiss and he carries her to Linda and Túlio.

Linda and Túlio adopt Fernando and live in their jungle sanctuary. Blu and Jewel raise three chicks together and celebrate with Rafael, Nico, Pedro, Luiz, Linda, and Túlio, who have set up a branch of Blu and Linda's Minnesota bookstore in Rio. Nigel has survived the plane crash, but Mauro ridicules him for losing his feathers. The smugglers are sent to jail.

Voice cast
 Jesse Eisenberg as Blu, a male Spix's macaw who was born in Rio de Janeiro but raised in Moose Lake, Minnesota, after he was smuggled.
 Anne Hathaway as Jewel, a female Spix's macaw from the Amazon Jungle, but was taken into Rio de Janeiro.
 will.i.am as Pedro, a red-crested cardinal who is Nico's best friend.
 Jamie Foxx as Nico, a yellow canary who is Pedro's best friend, loves to samba, and whose bottlecap hat functions as a tambourine.
 George Lopez as Rafael, a romantic, wise, and energetic toco toucan who is Eva's carnival loving mate.
 Tracy Morgan as Luiz, a bulldog who is Rafael's friend and a chainsaw expert who has a medical condition of drooling.
 Jemaine Clement as Nigel, a sadistic sulphur-crested cockatoo who used to be a TV star, but was replaced by a Parakeet, causing him to have a strong hatred for "pretty birds."
 Leslie Mann as Linda Gunderson, a girl who discovered Blu after he was taken from Rio de Janeiro to Moose Lake and adopted him for 15 years.
 Sofia Scarpa Saldanha as Young Linda Gunderson
 Rodrigo Santoro as Dr. Túlio Monteiro, a Brazilian ornithologist who befriends Linda. Santoro also voices a Soccer Announcer.
 Jake T. Austin as Fernando, Marcel's impoverished young assistant.
 Carlos Ponce as Marcel, Nigel's owner and the leader of a group of exotic bird smugglers.
 Davi Vieira as Armando, one of Marcel's henchmen.
 Jeffrey Garcia as Tipa, one of Marcel's henchmen. Garcia also voices a bat, who was among the captured birds.
 Jane Lynch as Alice, a Canada goose who is Chloe's sister.
 Wanda Sykes as Chloe, a Canada goose who is Alice's sister.
 Bebel Gilberto as Eva, a keel-billed toucan and Rafael's wife.
 Bernardo de Paula as Kipo, a roseate spoonbill, and Sylvio, the security guard at Túlio's aviary.
 Francisco Ramos as Mauro (credited as "Lead Marmoset"), the leader of the marmosets, his name wasn't mentioned in the film.

Production
Saldanha first had the idea for the film in 2005, involving a penguin being washed up on the beaches of Ipanema; it was changed to the current story after he learned of Happy Feet and Surf's Up (two other films involving penguins) being produced. He pitched the idea to Chris Wedge at Blue Sky in 2006. Saldanha showed the animators maps and books with geographic landmarks and measurements, from which they built a digital version of Rio. Later, a group of artists from the company visited Rio to see the various story locations. The animators also met with an expert on macaws at the Bronx Zoo to gain insight into their movement and personalities. Saldanha himself is a Brazilian from Rio de Janeiro; such elements of Brazilian culture and landmarks were also influenced from Saldanha growing up in Brazil.

The lead voice actors were approached in 2009. Jemaine Clement was approached to do the film after seeing test shots of his character Nigel doing a speech from Flight of the Conchords, which was done prior to a script being finalized. Neil Patrick Harris was supposed to voice Blu, but had other commitments outside production; he was later replaced by Jesse Eisenberg. Eisenberg was asked during the filming of The Social Network if he would do his voice recording on the weekends, and he agreed after reading the script, saying: "It was the perfect antidote to get out of the mindset of my character in Social Network who was so severe, and in some ways so joyless."

For music, they brought on board Sérgio Mendes to act as music guru and online living library. He in turn was able to reach out to artists such as will.i.am and Carlinhos Brown to provide music for the film.

Eisenberg and Anne Hathaway, who voiced Jewel, had acted together before when both were still teenagers, when they played siblings in the short-lived 1999 TV show Get Real. Hathaway stated in an interview that she didn't see Eisenberg during production of Rio except "socially throughout the process," but that she was "very happy for all of his success."

Music

Rio (Music from the Motion Picture) was released by Interscope Records on April 5, 2011, for digital download and followed by a physical release on April 12, 2011. The album was produced by the film's score composer John Powell (who regularly worked on most of Blue Sky's films) and Brazilian musician Sérgio Mendes, and features performances from the film's cast, alongside collaborations from Brazilian and American musicians. On March 18, 2011, Brazilian-English singer-songwriter Taio Cruz released a music video and theme song named "Telling the World" on YouTube for the soundtrack, and was released for digital download, two days later. It was positively received, and debuted at number 60 on Billboard 200 charts. Powell's score for the film was released into a separate album on April 19, 2011, by the Varèse Sarabande label.

Release
The world premiere of Rio took place on March 22, 2011, at a Cinépolis theater in Lagoa, Rio de Janeiro. The United States premiere was on April 10, 2011, at Grauman's Chinese Theatre in Hollywood, California, and was released throughout the country five days later. Since May 2009, it had been scheduled to be released in the United States on April 8, 2011, but in December 2010, it was rescheduled a week later to April 15, 2011. The film was also dedicated to the memory of Clymene Campos Saldanha.

Marketing
In April 2011, Oreo announced its special edition Oreo cookies with blue cream in promotion of the film. The promotion included stickers inside each package of cookies. Two types of contest were also announced: first, by completing an album of stickers, consumers could win three movie passes and medium snack bar combos; second, by finding winning stickers in packages with prizes including a trip to Rio de Janeiro, backpacks, cinema passes for a year, and 3D glasses. The promotion ended on May 30, 2011. The promotion is available in Ecuador, Peru, and Colombia.

On January 27, 2011, Rovio Mobile announced a partnership with 20th Century Fox to promote the film. The game Angry Birds Rio was released in March 2011 on the Android Market and the Apple App Store with 50 levels. Rovio released more levels throughout 2011. With the DVD and Blu-ray release, Rovio and 20th Century Fox announced that they were going to start selling Rio Plush Toys in the Angry Birds Online Store and the DVD and Blu-ray comes with a code for 15 Hidden Levels, along with 3 Angry Birds Rio Videos. Also, McDonald's ran a promotion with Rio toys in their Happy Meals.

In February 2011, the MPAA gave the film a PG rating for "mild off-color humor". The producers, displeased by this rating, resubmitted an edited version of the film to the ratings board one month later, and the MPAA changed the film to a G rating.

Home media
As a tribute to the country where most of the story is set and where the director was born, Rio was first released for home video in Brazil, on both DVD and Blu-ray, on July 7, 2011. The North American release date was August 2, 2011, and the Australian release date was September 28, 2011. As of June 2014, a total of 12 million Blu-ray and DVD units had been sold worldwide.

Rio is available in 4 different packages: a 4-disc "Party Edition" combination package (3D Blu-ray, Blu-ray, DVD, and Digital Copy), a 3-disc "Party Edition" combination package (Blu-ray, DVD, and Digital Copy), a 2-disc "Party Edition" combination package (DVD and Digital Copy), and a single disc DVD. The "Digital Copy" included with the 3-disc combination package is a separate disc that allows users to download a copy of the film to a computer through iTunes or Windows Media Player software. The 3-disc combination package also comes with an hour of bonus features.

Rio was also made available to Disney+ on April 16, 2021, but has been removed from the service as of December 2, 2021. However, it still remains in certain regions (such as New Zealand) as of December 16th, 2022. The film returned to Disney+ on March 3, 2023.

Video games

A video game based on the film was released on April 12, 2011, by THQ, for the Wii, Nintendo DS, PlayStation 3, and the Xbox 360. Another game, starring the Angry Birds, called Angry Birds Rio, was released in March 2011 for various mobile and desktop systems.

Reception (Rio)
The game received mixed reception, with, for lowest to highest, Metacritic at 60 out of 100 based on 16 reviews for the Xbox 360 version, and 65 out of 100 based on 8 reviews for the PlayStation 3 version. And in GameRankings, 40.00% for the Wii version, 58.00% for the Nintendo DS version, 64.73% for the Xbox 360 version, and 71.67% for the PlayStation 3.

Reception

Box office
Rio made $143.6 million in North America, along with $341 million in other territories for a total of $484.6 million worldwide, becoming the 13th highest-grossing film of 2011 and the 107th highest-grossing film of all time. It was the first film of 2011 to pass the $400-million mark.

North America
Rio debuted with $39.2 million during its opening weekend, ranking first at the box office. This was the highest-grossing opening weekend of 2011 that far, finishing the year at sixteenth. It also scored the largest opening weekend in April for an animated feature, and the sixth largest in April overall. On its second weekend (Easter weekend) it retained first place at the box office, dropping only 33% to $26.3 million, therefore surpassing that weekend's releases, Tyler Perry's Madea's Big Happy Family ($25.1 million), Water for Elephants ($16.8 million), and African Cats ($6 million), which ranked second, third, and sixth, respectively. Rios income of $143.6 million made it Blue Sky's second lowest box office result at the time, surpassing only Robots, and the 18th highest-grossing film of the year in North America.

Other territories
On its first weekend overseas (the weekend before its release in North America) it topped the box office with $54.9 million from 11,714 screens in 72 countries. On its second weekend it earned $55.4 million, still on top of the overseas box office and on its third weekend it remained at the summit of the box office, grossing an estimated $44.3 million. It therefore marked the second film that succeeded in topping the overseas box office three times in 2011, joining Tangled, although it is the only one that did it on three consecutive weekends.

In Brazil, the film's main setting and Saldanha's homeland, Rio was the largest release ever with over 1,000 screens. Its opening weekend gross of $8.4 million was the biggest ever for an American film (surpassed one year later by Madagascar 3: Europe's Most Wanted). On its second weekend it earned $7.2 million, falling just 14% from its opening. It then delivered the highest-grossing third weekend in history with $6.3 million (a 12% decline). Rio finished 2011 with a final gross of $36.8 million (R$68.7 million), the second highest income of the year after The Twilight Saga: Breaking Dawn – Part 1.

In Russia and the CIS, it topped the box office with $11.3 million during its opening weekend (including weekday previews), surpassing Tangled for the largest all-time opening of a non-sequel animated feature. It earned $24.7 million in total, marking the fourth largest animated film of all time. In Venezuela, it has earned $8 million, marking the second-highest-grossing film of all time behind Ice Age 3 ($11.6 million). In Uruguay, it is the fourth highest-grossing film of all time with $754,820 after Titanic ($2.1 million), Avatar ($1.1 million), and Ice Age 3 ($1 million). In Peru, grossing $3.8 million, it is the third-largest animated feature behind Ice Age 3 and Shrek Forever After, and the fourth highest-grossing film of all time behind these two and Avatar. In India, it grossed 10,000,000 in three weeks making the biggest animated opener ever.

Critical response

The website's consensus is: "This straightforward movie hits great heights thanks to its colorful visual palette, catchy music, and funny vocal performances." On Metacritic, which assigns a normalized rating out of 100 to 29 reviews from mainstream critics, the film has an average score of 63 out of 100, indicating "generally favorable reviews". Audiences polled by CinemaScore gave the film an average grade of "A" on an A+ to F scale.

Owen Gleiberman of Entertainment Weekly gave the film a mixed "C" rating; he praised the animation in Rio and its music, but later went on to say that the film is "less a Pixar-level pleasure than a busy, frantic, and overstuffed dessert of a movie." Betsy Sharkey of the Los Angeles Times gave the film a positive review, praising its comic action, voices and visuals.

Accolades

Expanded franchise

Sequel

A sequel, titled Rio 2, was released on April 11, 2014. Carlos Saldanha, the creator and director of the first film, returned as director. All the main cast, including Anne Hathaway, Jesse Eisenberg, Jemaine Clement, Jamie Foxx, will.i.am, Tracy Morgan, George Lopez, Jake T. Austin, Leslie Mann, and Rodrigo Santoro, reprised their roles. New cast includes Andy García, Bruno Mars, Kristin Chenoweth, Rita Moreno, Amandla Stenberg, Rachel Crow, Pierce Gagnon, and Natalie Morales. The sequel follows Blu, Jewel and their three kids on a venture into the Amazon where they try to live like real birds. Eventually, they find Jewel's long-lost father Eduardo, who is in hiding with a tribe of other Spix's macaw. At first everything seems perfect, but Blu is having trouble adapting to the wild. Eventually, they discover that the Amazon is under threat, and that Blu and Jewel's old nemesis, Nigel the cockatoo, is back for revenge.

Third film
Director Carlos Saldanha had kept the possibility for Rio 3 open. In April 2014, he stated, "Of course, I have a lot of stories to tell, so we're [starting to] prepare for it."

During the promotion of The Ice Age Adventures of Buck Wild, it was revealed that a third Rio movie was in development, with Jim Hecht writing the screenplay.

Spin-off
In October 2019, after the acquisition of 21st Century Fox by Disney, it was reported that a spin-off centered on Nico and Pedro was in early development for Disney+. The shut down of Blue Sky Studios in 2021 left the fate of this spin-off uncertain.

Rio: The 4-D Experience
Rio: The 4-D Experience is a 12-minute 4D film shown at various 4-D theatres over the world. Produced by SimEx-Iwerks, it premiered on September 27, 2013, at the San Diego Zoo 4-D Theater. Since May 24, 2014, it is being shown at the 5D Cinema at the revived Kentucky Kingdom. Since July 2014, it is being shown at the 4D Special FX Theater at Moody Gardens. And since October 25, 2014, it is being shown at the Roxy Theatre at Warner Bros. Movie World.

Notes

References

External links

 
 
 
 

2011 films
2011 3D films
2011 computer-animated films
2010s children's comedy films
2010s adventure comedy films
2010s American animated films
2010s children's animated films
American children's animated adventure films
American children's animated comedy films
American children's animated musical films
American computer-animated films
Animated films about birds
Brazil in fiction
Fictional birds
Fictional parrots
Films about animal rights
Films about animal cruelty
Films set in Brazil
Films set in Minnesota
Films set in Rio de Janeiro (city)
Films set in South America
Portuguese-language films
20th Century Fox films
20th Century Fox animated films
20th Century Fox Animation films
Blue Sky Studios films
Films directed by Carlos Saldanha
Films scored by John Powell
Rio (franchise)
Annie Award winners
3D animated films
20th Century Studios franchises
2011 comedy films
2010s English-language films